John Sorley (1870–unknown) was a Scottish footballer who played in the Football League for Blackburn Rovers, Burton Swifts and Newcastle United.

References

1870 births
Date of death unknown
Scottish footballers
English Football League players
Association football forwards
Newcastle East End F.C. players
Newcastle United F.C. players
Middlesbrough F.C. players
Blackburn Rovers F.C. players
Burton Swifts F.C. players
Hebburn Argyle F.C. players